Consuelo or Consuela may refer to:

Arts and entertainment
Consuelo (novel), an 1842–1843 novel by George Sand
Consuela (Family Guy), a character in Family Guy
"Consuelo", a 2002 song by Belle and Sebastian from Storytelling

Places
 Consuelo, Dominican Republic
 Consuelo, Queensland, Australia
 Consuelo Formation, a geological formation in Cuba

Other uses
 Consuelo (name), a female given name
 Consuelo (TransMilenio), a bus station in Bogotá, Colombia
 HMS Sealark (1903), previously Consuelo, a steam yacht